Archibald McLardie was a Scottish footballer who played in the Scottish League for St Mirren, Vale of Leven and Dumbarton as a forward and right half during the 1910s and 1920s.

References 

Scottish footballers
Dumbarton F.C. players
Vale of Leven F.C. players
Scottish Football League players
St Mirren F.C. players
Association football inside forwards
Association football outside forwards
Association football wing halves
Johnstone F.C. players